James Harpur (born 1956) is a British born Irish poet who has published eight books of poetry. He has won a number of awards, including the Michael Hartnett Award and the UK National Poetry Competition. He has also published books of non-fiction and a novel, The Pathless Country. He lives in West Cork and is a member of Aosdána, the Irish academy of the arts.

Biography
James Harpur was born in Britain in 1956 to an Irish father and a British mother and now lives near Clonakilty in Co. Cork. His father was born in Timahoe, Co. Laois, the son of a Church of Ireland minister, and his mother was born in Le Vésinet, Paris. Harpur studied Classics and English at Trinity College, Cambridge, where he was a joint-winner of the Powell Prize for Poetry. He taught English on the island of Crete and has subsequently worked as a lexicographer and freelance writer.

Works

Poetry 
Many of the poems of his first collection, A Vision of Comets, take their inspiration from his time on Crete and from the Aegean area. In 1995 he won the UK National Poetry Competition with a sonnet sequence, ‘The Frame of Furnace Light’, about the death of his father. The poem was published in his second book, The Monk’s Dream. In 2000 Harpur became poet in residence in Exeter Cathedral, as part of the UK’s ‘Year of the Artist’ scheme. In 2002 he moved to Ireland and settled in West Cork, near the town of Clonakilty. His book, The Dark Age, featuring a sequence on Irish Dark Age saints, won the 2009 Michael Hartnett Award. Further books include The White Silhouette (2018), described by the Irish Times as a ‘resonant, moving pilgrimage of great beauty’, and The Examined Life (2021), described by Stephen Fry as a ‘quite marvellous work … an Odyssey, a Ulysses shaken up in the snow-dome of A Portrait of the Artist as a Young Man.’

Fiction 
In 2021 Harpur published his first novel, The Pathless Country, winner of the J.G. Farrell Award and an Irish Writers’ Centre Novel Fair award. The story is set in early-1900s Ireland and London, and features a number of historical characters, including W.B. Yeats, Annie Besant, and J. Krishnamurti.

Poetry style 
According to the introduction to Harpur on the Poetry International website, he ‘is essentially an interior poet with a fascination for spirituality, and his poems are full of references to Christian as well as to other religious traditions. Stylistically, he has a deep sympathy with the mythopoeic strand of poetry, from Homer, Virgil and Dante to the Romantics and Yeats, Eliot and Ted Hughes. His non-literary influences include Carl Jung and J. Krishnamurti’. In a review of The White Silhouette, Michael O’Neill wrote: ‘I have rarely encountered a contemporary voice that brings out as strongly and convincingly as does James Harpur’s in The White Silhouette the way in which spiritual wrestlings and traditions can live again in poetry.’

Prizes and awards

Poetry 

 Vincent Buckley Poetry Prize 2016
 Patrick and Katherine Kavanagh Fellowship 2013
 Michael Hartnett Poetry Award 2009
 UK National Poetry Competition 1995
 Eric Gregory Award 1985

Fiction 
(for The Pathless Country)

 John McGahern Prize (shortlisted) 2022
 J.G. Farrell Award (2019)
 Irish Writers’ Centre Novel Fair Award (2016)

Bibliography

Poetry
 The Oratory of Light, Wild Goose, 2021
 The Examined Life, Two Rivers Press, 2021
 The White Silhouette, Carcanet, 2018
 Angels and Harvesters, Anvil Press Poetry, 2012
 The Dark Age, Anvil Press Poetry, 2007
 Oracle Bones, Anvil Press Poetry, 2001
 The Monk’s Dream, Anvil Press Poetry, 1996 
 A Vision of Comets, Anvil Press Poetry, 1993

Translation 
 Fortune’s Prisoner: The poems of Boethius’s Consolation of Philosophy, Anvil Press Poetry, 2007

Fiction 

 The Pathless Country, Cinnamon Press, 2021

Spiritual books 
 The Pilgrim Journey (non-fiction), BlueBridge, 2015
 Love Burning in the Soul: the Story of the Christian Mystics (non-fiction), Shambhala, 2005
 The Gospel of Joseph of Arimathea (poetry and prose), Wild Goose, 2008

External links 
Official website https://www.jamesharpur.com

Introduction to Harpur’s work on the Poetry International website: https://www.poetryinternational.com/en/poets-poems/poets/poet/102-12503_Harpur

Interview with Harpur by Poetry Ireland Review (via author’s website): https://www.jamesharpur.com/pirpiece.htm

Interview with Harpur by Kevin Brophy for Axon magazine (Australia): https://axonjournal.com.au/issues/8-2/james-harpur-process-20132017

See also
 List of Irish writers

References

1956 births
Aosdána members
20th-century Irish male writers
21st-century Irish male writers
Irish poets
Living people
Alumni of Trinity College, Cambridge